Elaeodendron melanocarpum is a species of shrubs or small trees endemic to northern Australia. The natural range extends from The Kimberley across The Top End to Cape York Peninsula and southwards to South East Queensland. The species occurs in monsoon forest and drier types of rainforests, commonly along streams.

Elaeodendron melanocarpum was previously included in the genus Cassine; however, now it is considered that only three African species belong to Cassine.

Description
Elaeodendron melanocarpum can grow as a small trees up to 15 m tall, however the more common growth form is a straggly shrub growing in rocky locales. The glossy green leaves are opposite, and oval or elliptical in shape. Flowers are small and white, with separate male and female flowers. Fruits are black and fleshy, up to 2 cm long, with a stony endocarp. Overall the fruit resembles an olive or a small plum, and this is the origin of the common names for of olive plum, false olive and black olive.

Gallery

References

Sapindales of Australia
Trees of Australia
Flora of Queensland
Flora of New South Wales
Flora of Western Australia
Flora of the Northern Territory
melanocarpum
Taxa named by Ferdinand von Mueller